Galena, also called lead glance, is the natural mineral form of lead(II) sulfide (PbS). It is the most important ore of lead and an important source of silver.

Galena is one of the most abundant and widely distributed sulfide minerals. It crystallizes in the cubic crystal system often showing octahedral forms. It is often associated with the minerals sphalerite, calcite and fluorite.

Occurrence

Galena is the main ore of lead, used since ancient times, since lead can be smelted from galena in an ordinary wood fire. Galena typically is found in hydrothermal veins in association with sphalerite, marcasite, chalcopyrite, cerussite, anglesite, dolomite, calcite, quartz, barite, and fluorite. It is also found in association with sphalerite in low-temperature lead-zinc deposits within limestone beds. Minor amounts are found in contact metamorphic zones, in pegmatites, and disseminated in sedimentary rock.

In some deposits the galena contains up to 0.5% silver, a byproduct that far surpasses the main lead ore in revenue. In these deposits significant amounts of silver occur as included silver sulfide mineral phases or as limited silver in solid solution within the galena structure. These argentiferous galenas have long been an important ore of silver. Silver-bearing galena is almost entirely of hydrothermal origin; galena in lead-zinc deposits contains little silver.

Galena deposits are found worldwide in various environments. Noted deposits include those at Freiberg in Saxony; Cornwall, the Mendips in Somerset, Derbyshire, and Cumberland in England; the Madan and Rhodope Mountains in Bulgaria; the Sullivan Mine of British Columbia; Broken Hill and Mount Isa in Australia; and the ancient mines of Sardinia.

In the United States, it occurs most notably as lead-zinc ore in the Mississippi Valley type deposits of the Lead Belt in southeastern Missouri, which is the largest known deposit, and in the Driftless Area of Illinois, Iowa and Wisconsin. Galena also was a major mineral of the zinc-lead mines of the tri-state district around Joplin in southwestern Missouri and the adjoining areas of Kansas and Oklahoma. Galena is also an important ore mineral in the silver mining regions of Colorado, Idaho, Utah and Montana. Of the latter, the Coeur d'Alene district of northern Idaho was most prominent.

Australia is world's leading producer of lead as of 2021, most of which is extracted as galena.  Argentiferous galena was accidentally discovered at Glen Osmond in 1841, and additional deposits were discovered near Broken Hill in 1876 and at Mount Isa in 1923. Most galena in Australia is found in hydrothermal deposits emplaced around 1680 million years ago, which have since been heavily metamorphosed.

Importance
Galena is the official state mineral of the U.S. states of Kansas, Missouri, and Wisconsin; the former mining communities of Galena, Kansas, and Galena, Illinois, take their names from deposits of this mineral.

Structure
Galena belongs to the octahedral sulfide group of minerals that have metal ions in octahedral positions, such as the iron sulfide pyrrhotite and the nickel arsenide niccolite. The galena group is named after its most common member, with other isometric members that include manganese bearing alabandite and niningerite.

Divalent lead (Pb) cations and sulfur (S) anions form a close-packed cubic unit cell much like the mineral halite of the halide mineral group. Zinc, cadmium, iron, copper, antimony, arsenic, bismuth and selenium also occur in variable amounts in galena. Selenium substitutes for sulfur in the structure constituting a solid solution series. The lead telluride mineral altaite has the same crystal structure as galena.

Geochemistry

Within the weathering or oxidation zone galena alters to anglesite (lead sulfate) or cerussite (lead carbonate). Galena exposed to acid mine drainage can be oxidized to anglesite by naturally occurring bacteria and archaea, in a process similar to bioleaching.

Uses

One of the oldest uses of galena was in the eye cosmetic kohl. In Ancient Egypt, this was applied around the eyes to reduce the glare of the desert sun and to repel flies, which were a potential source of disease.

In pre-Columbian North America, galena was used by indigenous peoples as an ingredient in decorative paints and cosmetics, and widely traded throughout the eastern United States. Traces of galena are frequently found at the Mississippian city at Kincaid Mounds in present-day Illinois. The galena used at the site originated from deposits in southeastern and central Missouri and the Upper Mississippi Valley.

Galena is the primary ore of lead, and is often mined for its silver content. It is used as a source of lead in ceramic glaze.

Galena is a semiconductor with a small band gap of about 0.4 eV, which found use in early wireless communication systems. It was used as the crystal in crystal radio receivers, in which it was used as a point-contact diode capable of rectifying alternating current to detect the radio signals. The galena crystal was used with a sharp wire, known as a "cat's whisker" in contact with it.

See also
List of minerals
Lead smelter

References

External links

 Case Studies in Environmental Medicine (CSEM): Lead Toxicity.
 ToxFAQs: Lead.
 Mineral Information Institute entry for lead.

Lead minerals
Galena group
Alchemical substances
Cubic minerals
Minerals in space group 225
Wisconsin culture
Symbols of Wisconsin
Symbols of Missouri